The Song Lives On is the collaboration album by former Jazz Crusaders member Joe Sample and R&B singer Lalah Hathaway. The album was released on April 20, 1999.

Background
In 1998, Lalah Hathaway and Joe Sample began working on their collaborative album. Hathaway sang most of the lead vocals on such songs as "When Your Life Was Low" and the cover song "Fever", while Sample supplied the instruments like piano.

Music
The jazz influenced album contained mostly slow piano ballads with an extra addition of drums and horns. The songs of album are a little similar to Hathaway previous album A Moment. The track "So They Say" from her previous album, had an influence on the album, which were showcased in the song "When Your Life Was Low". Lalah Hathaway and Joe Sample also covered the song "Fever", which was slightly altered by adding more piano. The Song Lives On also contains a cover of The Crusaders' hit "Street Life".

Promotion and release
The album was bolstered by the single "When Your Life Was Low". After the release of the lead single, the album was released on April 20, 1999. The album debut at No. 196 on the Billboard 200, No. 53 on the Top R&B Albums chart, and No. 2 on the Top Contemporary Jazz Album chart. The second single was the covered song "Fever".

Critical response

The album received a favorable review from Allmusic stating, "The daughter of the popular late R&B singer Donny, husky voiced Lalah Hathaway is the perfect foil for Joe Sample's compelling notion that The Song Lives On. Finding a happy medium between the graceful straight-ahead jazz trio vibe of his Invitation album and the plucky pop energy of Spellbound, Sample provides Hathaway on seven of the 11 tunes with a showcase for her sultry approach."

Jonathan Widran further went on to say, "On a cover of his Crusaders hit "Street Life," Hathaway turns the title into a mantra and Sample echoes her sentiments with sharp, percussive reiterations of the song's main melody. Then Hathaway stops and Michael Thompson steps in with some edgy electric guitar lines. Other song choices range from reverent takes on standards like "Fever" and "For All We Know" to vocal versions of older, well-known Sample instrumental hits; for example, with Norman Gimbel's cheery lyrics, Hathaway turns the once moody "All God's Children" into a life-affirming love song."

Commercial success
The Song Lives On went on to become one of Lalah Hathaway and Joe Sample's most successful album to chart. In response to the album's success, Hathaway and Sample were honored with Billboard/BET On Jazz Award for "Mainstream Jazz Album".

Track listing

Personnel
 Jay Anderson - bass  
 Lenny Castro - percussion  
 David Delhomme - synthesizer  
 Koji Egawa - assistant engineer  
 Lalah Hathaway - vocals, vocal arrangement  
 Patrick Rains - management  
 Walfredo Reyes - drums
 Joe Sample - piano, arranger, producer, Fender Rhodes, instrument arrangement  
 Alan Sanderson - assistant engineer  
 Doug Sax - mastering  
 Bill Schnee - producer, engineer, mixing  
 Steven Silverstein - photography  
 Michael Thompson - electric guitar
 Kirk Whalum - saxophone

References

1999 albums
Lalah Hathaway albums
Joe Sample albums